Federal Trade Commission v. Colgate-Palmolive Company, 380 U.S. 374 (1965), was a United States Supreme Court case.

Background 
A Colgate-Palmolive advertisement claimed that its Palmolive Rapid Shave shaving cream was so good it could be used to shave sandpaper. The commercial showed sandpaper applied with shaving cream and then shaved.

The Federal Trade Commission (FTC) complained that the ad was deceptive and a material misrepresentation because it was not sandpaper but rather sand sprinkled on glass. Colgate-Palmolive argued that the product really could shave sandpaper if left on long enough. Colgate-Palmolive sued arguing that the FTC had overstepped its authority.

Opinion of the Court 
The Supreme Court agreed with the FTC that the commercial was a material misrepresentation. The ruling forced advertisers to remain truthful in their product presentations. As a result, commercials often feature "dramatization" notifications.

External links 
 
 The Sandpaper Test, Museum of Hoaxes

Colgate-Palmolive
United States Supreme Court cases
United States Supreme Court cases of the Warren Court
1965 in United States case law
Colgate